The Musketeers is a 1961 Danish family film directed by Annelise Hovmand and starring Jens Østerholm. It was followed by the 1963 film Dronningens vagtmester.

Plot
The film is set in 1658, a war goes, and winter is cold and harsh. The Swedish King Karl X Gustav, who is drawn with his army from Germany and staying in Jutland, can easily access Copenhagen. In South Zealand, the cuckolds fight against the Swedish supremacy under the leadership of Svend Poulsen, who is called the Gønhøvdingen. Svend gets an unofficial assignment from King Frederik III; to travel to Vordingborg Church to collect 50,000 Rigsdaler and securities belonging to the King. Then the assets must be relocated from Vordingborg to Copenhagen to pay for Copenhagen's defense, and it is important that they arrive in time. Svend gets help from his brother-in-law, Ib Abel. Together, Svend and Ib are trying to get past the Swedish lines as silently as possible, but it is not so easy as they are hunted by a mad German captain and his witch.

Cast
 Jens Østerholm as Svend Poulsen (Gøngehøvdingen)
 Dirch Passer as Ib
 Ove Sprogøe as Tam
 Birgitte Federspiel as Kulsoen
 Hans Kurt as Kaptajn Mannheimer
 Ghita Nørby as Inger
 Mogens Wieth as Frederik III
 Pauline Schumann as Dronning Sophie Amalie
 Asbjørn Andersen as Borgmester Nansen
 Georg Årlin as Colonel Sparre
 Bent Mejding as Tange
 Annegrethe Nissen as Ane Marie
 Anne Werner Thomsen as Julie Parsberg
 Jørn Jeppesen as Korporal Staal
 Keld Markuslund as Præsten Søren

External links

1961 films
Danish children's films
1960s Danish-language films
Films directed by Annelise Hovmand
Films set in the 1650s